Unimix is an enriched maize and bean flour designed and used to fight malnutrition. It contains maize (corn) flour, soy beans, oil, milk powder, and sugar; plus vitamins and minerals. The standard use is to make into porridge by cooking it with water and having this in addition to whatever other food is available. It can also be used in place of flour to make bread or other foods according to local customs. Humanitarian organizations ship Unimix in large quantities to starving people in order to fight severe malnutrition, especially in children, who need substantial protein to grow.

For example, in the Niger Food Crisis in 2005, 206 tons of Unimix were delivered to Niger, along with 34.5 tons of therapeutic milk and 2.6 tons of locally-purchased therapeutic food.

References and sources

See also
 RUTF

External links
 Media report of Unicef Pakistan

Flour